Exoprosopa jacchus is a species of 'bee flies' belonging to the family Bombyliidae subfamily Anthracinae.

Commonly named 'silvery bee-fly', this species is present in most of Europe.

The average body length of the adults reaches . The head and the thorax are dark-brown. The thorax is quite hairy and marked by silvery-white scales. The abdomen is blackish with a few silver hair stripes and it is hairy on the sides. The wings are mottled light and dark-brown, with hyaline patches on the front border cell (R1). The third segment of the antennae is longer than the fourth.

References
 Mark van Veen, Zeist -     Exoprosopa Keys

External links
 Biolib
 Fauna Europaea 
 Macroinstantes

Bombyliidae
Insects described in 1805
Diptera of Europe